The  is the first of a series of three-wheeled cargo carriers made in Japan by Mitsubishi between 1947 and 1962. A number of prototypes were built in 1946, leading to series production beginning in May 1947. Along with the Silver Pigeon scooter it represented the company's first contributions to the Japanese post-war personal transport boom.

Mizushima Works
The Mizushima Aircraft works was originally established in September 1943 to build the Mitsubishi G4M2 (504 examples) and later the N1K2-J Shiden-Kai (7 planes completed). The factory was built on mostly virgin land, and the township of Mizushima, Kurashiki was established around the plant. The factory was heavily damaged in a 22 June 1945 B-29 bombing raid and no more planes were produced. In November 1945, the Occupying Forces were petitioned to allow the company to be reorganized for peacetime activities, and Mizushima Engineering Works was born. Originally part of Mitsubishi Heavy Industries, the zaibatsu was broken up into three separate companies in January 1950, with Mizushima becoming part of Central Japan Heavy-Industries, Ltd. This company was renamed Shin-Mitsubishi Heavy Industries in May 1952, as the occupation ended and the Mitsubishi name was once again allowed to be used. The Mizushima factory changed name again in October 1960, becoming the "Mizushima Motor Works."

TM3
The Mizushima XTM-1 prototype was completed in 1946. The original production version (TM3A) appeared the following year and was a mechanically simple and rugged vehicle, with a 400 kg carrying capacity. Unlike most three-wheeled trucks in the market, however, the TM3A was equipped with a folding canvas covering and a windshield to protect the occupants.

Evolutions
Later models would be introduced offering greater load-bearing abilities and a wider variety of bodystyles. The 1948–50 TM3D model was built with a hardtop passenger cabin in response to customer demands, while the final development of the Mizushima line, the TM18 Mitsubishi 1500 pickup introduced in 1955, could carry up to two tons in its cargo bed. The first models had air-cooled single-cylinder engines, but with the 1955 TM7 a 1.3-liter OHV twin-cylinder engine with  appeared.

During the Mizushima's life approximately 91,000 were produced, before it was replaced by the Mitsubishi Minicab and various other four-wheeled light- and medium-duty trucks in 1962.

Mizushima models

Leo

The 1959 Mitsubishi Leo, heavily influenced by the Mizushima, was a transition between the company's first post-war vehicles and the Mitsubishi Minica, which represented the company's future in the 1960s. The Leo used a 309 cc air-cooled single-cylinder engine, the ME20, producing 12.5 hp at 4,500 rpm.

Almost four decades later, Olivier Boulay would borrow heavily from the Leo for styling cues for his first prototypes when he became Mitsubishi Motors' design chief in 2001.

References

Three-wheeled motor vehicles
Mizushima
1940s cars